Mehrdasht is a city in Yazd Province, Iran.

Mehrdasht may also refer to:

Mehrdasht, Tehran
Mehrdasht District, in Isfahan Province